The Crusaders (original title: Crociati) is a 2001 Italian television mini-series written by Andrea Porporati and directed by Dominique Othenin-Girard. The film was also dubbed in English and other languages.

Plot
In the 11th century three men flee from an Italian city and make their way to the Holy Land to take part in the First Crusade (AD 1096-1099).

Cast
Alessandro Gassman as Peter
Thure Riefenstein as Andrew
Johannes Brandrup as Richard
Barbora Bobuľová as Rachel
Uwe Ochsenknecht as Baron Corrado
Flavio Insinna as Peter Bartholomew
Armin Mueller-Stahl as Alessio
Franco Nero as Ibn-Azul
Miloš Timotijević as Johann
Karin Proia as Maria
Slobodan Ninkovic as Olaf Gunnarson

See also
List of historical drama films

External links

2001 television films
2001 films
2000s adventure drama films
2000s historical adventure films
Italian television miniseries
Films set in the 11th century
Television series set in the 11th century
Films directed by Dominique Othenin-Girard
Italian swashbuckler films
Films set in Italy
Crusades films
Italian historical adventure films
Films scored by Harald Kloser
2000s Italian films